Marmylevo is a rural locality (a village) in Zhukovsky Selsoviet, Ufimsky District, Bashkortostan, Russia. The population was 232 as of 2010. There are 6 streets.

Geography 
Marmylevo is located 22 km west of Ufa (the district's administrative centre) by road. Romanovka is the nearest rural locality.

References 

Rural localities in Ufimsky District